El Duende is an unincorporated community and census-designated place in Rio Arriba County, New Mexico, United States. Its population was 707 as of the 2010 census. The community is located at the junction of U.S. Routes 84/285 and New Mexico State Road 74. El Duende means "the dwarf" in Spanish, but how and why it adopted this moniker is unknown.

Geography

Demographics

Education
It is in Española Public Schools. The comprehensive public high school is Española Valley High School.

References

Census-designated places in New Mexico
Census-designated places in Rio Arriba County, New Mexico